Nabil Elaraby (Arabic: نبيل العربي; born 15 March 1935) is an Egyptian politician and diplomat who was Secretary General of the Arab League from 1 July 2011 to 3 July 2016. Previously, he was Foreign Affairs Minister of Egypt in Essam Sharaf's government from March to June 2011.

Early life and education
Elaraby was born on 15 March 1935. He holds a J.S.D. (1971) and an LL.M. (1969) from New York University School of Law and a law degree from Cairo University's Faculty of Law (1955).

Career
Elaraby is a partner at Zaki Hashem & Partners in Cairo, specializing in negotiations and arbitration.

Egyptian government
Elaraby was legal adviser and director in the Legal and Treaties Department of the Ministry of Foreign Affairs from 1976 to 1978 and then Ambassador to India from 1981 to 1983. He then returned to his previous post at the Foreign Ministry from 1983 to 1987.

He was legal adviser to the Egyptian delegation to the Camp David Middle East peace conference in 1978, head of the Egyptian delegation to the Taba negotiations from 1985 to 1989, and Agent of the Egyptian Government to the Egyptian-Israeli arbitration tribunal (Taba dispute) from 1986 to 1988.

He was appointed by the Egyptian Minister of Justice on the list of arbitrators in civil and commercial affairs in Egypt in 1995.

United Nations
In 1968, Elaraby was an Adlai Stevenson Fellow in International Law at the United Nations Institute for Training and Research (UNITAR). He was appointed a Special Fellow in International Law at UNITAR in 1973, and was legal adviser to the Egyptian delegation to the United Nations Geneva Middle East peace conference from 1973 to 1975.

Elarby was Egypt's Deputy Permanent Representative to the United Nations in New York from 1978 to 1981, the Permanent Representative to the UN Office at Geneva from 1987 to 1991, the Permanent Representative to the UN in New York from 1991 to 1999, a member of the International Law Commission of the United Nations from 1994 to 2004, President of the Security Council in 1996, and vice-president of the General Assembly in 1993, 1994 and 1997. He was a commissioner at the United Nations Compensation Commission in Geneva from 1999 to 2001, and a member of the International Court of Justice from 2001 to February 2006.

Elaraby has served as chairman for the First (Disarmament and international security questions) Committee of the General Assembly, the Informal Working Group on an Agenda for Peace, the Working Group on Legal Instruments for the UN Conference on Environment and Development in Rio de Janeiro, and the UN Special Committee on Enhancing the Principle of the Prohibition of the Use of Force in International Relations.

Other international work

Elaraby was an Arbitrator at the International Chamber of Commerce International Court of Arbitration in Paris in a dispute concerning the Suez Canal from 1989 to 1992. He was a judge in the Judicial Tribunal of the Organization of Arab Petroleum Exporting Countries in 1990.

Elaraby was a member of the governing board of the Stockholm International Peace Research Institute from 2000 to 2010. Since December 2008 he has been serving as the Director of the Regional Cairo Centre for International Commercial Arbitration and as a counsel of the Sudanese government in the "Abyei Boundary" Arbitration between the Government of Sudan and the Sudanese People's Revolutionary Movement.

Elaraby has also served as a Member of the Board for the Cairo Regional Centre for International Commercial Arbitration, a Member of the Board for the Egyptian Society of International Law, and a Member of the World Intellectual Property Organization Arbitration and Mediation Centre List of Neutrals.

2011 Egyptian revolution and transitional government

Nabil Elaraby was one of the group of about 30 high-profile Egyptians acting as liaison between the protesters and the government, and pressing for the removal of President Hosni Mubarak.

At a democracy forum on 25 February 2011, he said the Egyptian government suffered from a lack of separation of powers, a lack of transparency and a lack of judicial independence. He said foreign policy should be based on Egypt's interests, including "holding Israel accountable when it does not respect its obligations."

On 6 March 2011, he was appointed Foreign Affairs Minister of Egypt in Essam Sharaf's post-revolution cabinet. Since then he has opened the Rafah Border Crossing with Gaza and brokered the reconciliation of Hamas with Fatah.

Arab League
On 15 May 2011, he was appointed Secretary General of the Arab League, succeeding Amr Moussa. He officially took office on 1 July 2011.

Honours

Publications
 Taba, Camp David, Israeli West Bank barrier :  From United Nations Security Council to the International Court of Justice, ed. Dar al-Chorouq, Cairo, 2017.

References

External links
 at the Ministry of Foreign Affairs

Egypt’s foreign minister on the way forward after Mubarak, Lally Weymouth, The Washington Post, 6 May 2011
Nabil El-Arabi -- justice-based diplomacy, Dina Ezzat, Al-Ahram Weekly, 19 May 2011

|-

|-

1935 births
Ambassadors of Egypt to India
Cairo University alumni
20th-century Egyptian judges
Egyptian Muslims
Foreign ministers of Egypt
International Court of Justice judges
International Law Commission officials
Living people
New York University School of Law alumni
Politicians from Cairo
Permanent Representatives of Egypt to the United Nations
Secretaries General of the Arab League
Egyptian judges of United Nations courts and tribunals
20th-century Egyptian diplomats
21st-century Egyptian diplomats